The Canton of Saint-Pol-de-Léon is a French canton, located in the arrondissement of Morlaix, in the Finistère département (Brittany région). Since the French canton reorganisation which came into effect in March 2015, the communes of the canton of Saint-Pol-de-Léon are:

 Cléder
 Île-de-Batz
 Lanhouarneau
 Mespaul
 Plouénan
 Plouescat
 Plougoulm
 Plounévez-Lochrist
 Roscoff
Saint-Pol-de-Léon (seat)
 Santec
 Sibiril
 Tréflaouénan
 Tréflez

See also
Cantons of the Finistère department
List of cantons of France
Arrondissements of the Finistère department

References

Cantons of Finistère